Vanbawng is a village in the Phullen Block of Saitual district, in the state of Mizoram in India. According to the 2011 census, the population of Vanbawng is 1,231 people, comprising 220 households. 49% of the population (609 people) are males, and 51% (622 people) are females. All the residents are members of Scheduled Tribes. The literacy rate is 83%. The population of Vanbawng strongly reflects the different communities of the ethnic Mizo people.

Population 
15.84% (195 people) of Vanbawng's population are between 0-6 years old. The average sex ratio and the child sex ratio are both higher than the same averages for the Mizoram state.

Vanbawng has a higher literacy rate than Mizoram. In 2011, Vanbawng had a literacy rate of 98.17%, while Mizoram had a literacy rate of 91.33%. In Vanbawng, the literacy rate for men was 97.88%, while the literacy rate for women was 98.45%.

Per the constitution of India and the Panchyati Raaj Act, Vanbawng is administrated by Sarpanch (Head of Village), who is the elected representative.

Demographics 
Vanbawng is a village in Phullen Block in Saitual District of the Indian state of Mizoram. According to the 2011 census, the population in Vanbawng village is 1,231, comprising 220 households. 609 males (49% of the population) and 622 females (51%) live there. All the residents are members of Scheduled Tribes. The literacy rate is 1,017 (83% ).
 Caste Factor
In Vanbawng village, most of the village population is from Schedule Tribe (ST). Schedule Tribe (ST) constitutes 99.59% of total population in Vanbawng village. There is no population of Schedule Caste (SC) in Vanbawng village of Aizawl.
 Work Profile
In Vanbawng village out of total population, 686 were engaged in work activities. 99.71% of workers describe their work as Main Work (Employment or Earning more than 6 Months) while 0.29% were involved in Marginal activity providing livelihood for less than 6 months. Of 686 workers engaged in Main Work, 640 were cultivators (owner or co-owner) while 1 were Agricultural labourer.

Geography 
Vanbawng is located in north of the Manipur boarder of Mizoram. It is situated on a ridge 1,132 metres (3715 ft) above sea level, with the Tuivai river valley to its east and the Tuivawl river valley to its west.

Religion

Presbyterians make up the majority of the population. However, Baptists, United Pentecostal Church and Seventh-day Adventists also live in the village.

Climate
Vanbawng has a mild, sub-tropical climate due to its location and elevation. Under the Köppen climate classification, Vanbawng features a humid subtropical climate (Cwa). Rainfall is mostly concentrated between April and October, with the heaviest rainfall occurring in May, July, August and September. The remainder of the year is notably drier.

References 

 

Villages in Mizoram